Eager Seas (formerly known as Lakes) is an American indie rock band, formed in June 2006 in Atascadero, California, consisting mainly of the former band members of Watashi Wa. They were signed to The Militia Group and on September 5, 2006, released a five-song EP named Photographs EP. They are now independent as of their latest release in 2018 

Seth Roberts, the lead vocalist of Watashi Wa, formed a new ensemble called Eager Seas after Watashi Wa's 2004 break-up, but the subsequent album was released under the name Watashi Wa in 2006. Roberts then left Tooth & Nail Records and signed with The Militia Group, with the new ensemble renamed Lakes.

Their first show was played at the Cornerstone festival in 2006, where they also sold a limited number (200 copies) of their EP. This was more than a month before the official release date. The EP, released in September 2006, featured guest appearances by Mike Herrera of MxPx and Aaron Marsh of Copeland. Lakes uploaded a new song on MySpace on August 24, entitled "The Heart Is An Anchor".

On August 11, 2010, Lakes announced the release of their full-length album, The Agreement. The album was released on September 3, 2010, and featured 14 tracks.

March 19, 2015, Lakes announced via the Facebook page that they would return to their original name, Eager Seas.

Eager Seas released their latest Album "Mine As Well" on Nov 30, 2018.

Band members
Current members
 Seth Roberts - Vocals, Guitar, Mandolin, Keyboards
 Jeremy Wells - Bass, Vocals
 Miles Castenholz - Guitar
 Theodore Ramirez - Drums

Former members
 Jacob Wick - Drums, Vocals, Guitar, Violin, Keyboards
 Matthew Covington - Vocals, Accordion, Piano, Mandolin, Guitar
 Jason Massey - Vocals, Guitar, Drums, Piano, Keyboards
 Roger Tompkins - Bass, Background Vocals
 Simon Jones - Bass
 Kevin Foster - Vocals, Mandolin, Guitar
 Justin Sears - Drums
 Aaron Wick - Drums
 Seth Igarta - Bass

Discography
Photographs EP (2006, The Militia Group)
The Agreement (2010)
Fire Ahead (2014)
California Christmas EP (2014)
Mine As Well (2018)

References

External links
Lakes Myspace page
Official Eager Seas website

Musical groups established in 2004
Pop punk groups from California